Gomur may refer to:
Gemer (village), Slovakia
Gomk, village in Armenia

See also
Gömür (disambiguation)